Jeotgalicoccus psychrophilus is a gram-positive bacterium. It is psychrophilic, it growth between 4 and 34 °C. To this also refers the selected species name. The cells are coccoid.

References

External links
Type strain of Jeotgalicoccus psychrophilus at BacDive -  the Bacterial Diversity Metadatabase

psychrophilus
Bacteria described in 2003
Psychrophiles